The Love Tour was a tour by the Irish band Westlife seen by 390,000 fans. The tour started in Australia, and covered Africa and UK in 2007. The tour had a subtotal of £1,031,033 gross secondary ticket sales.

Support acts 
Code 5
Cushh
Dyyce
Lady Nada
The MacDonald Brothers
The Unconventionals

Setlist

Tour dates

Festivals and other miscellaneous performances
This concert was a part of "94.5 Kfm's Night of the Superstars"

Cancellations and rescheduled shows

References

Westlife concert tours
2007 concert tours